Ducharme is a surname. Notable people with the surname include:

 Annette Ducharme, Canadian musician and songwriter
 Denis Ducharme (born 1955), Canadian politician
 Dominique Ducharme (1765–1853), French Canadian settler and fur trader
 Dominique Ducharme (born 1973), Canadian ice hockey coach and player
 Gerry Ducharme (born 1939), Canadian politician
 Jacques Ducharme (1910–1993), American novelist and historian
 Jean-Marie Ducharme (1723–1807), fur trader and politician
 Moira Leiper Ducharme, Canadian politician
 Paul DuCharme (1917–1985), American basketball player
 Raymond Ducharme Morand (1887–1952), Canadian politician
 Réjean Ducharme (1941–2017), Canadian novelist and playwright
 Richard Ducharme (born 1948), Canadian administrator
 Romulus Ducharme (1886–1976), Canadian politician
 Severin Ducharme (1866–19??), Canadian politician
 Theresa Ducharme (1945–2004), Canadian activist
 Todd Ducharme, Canadian judge
 Yvan Ducharme (1937–2013), Canadian actor
 Yves Ducharme (born 1958), Canadian politician